Sirsy (stylized as SIRSY) is an American rock duo from Albany, New York consisting of husband and wife Melanie Krahmer (vocals, drums, flute) and Rich Libutti (guitar, bass). During their live shows, Krahmer also plays bass on a keyboard with her drumstick and Libutti plays bass pedals with his feet.

In addition to touring the East Coast of the United States, Sirsy has been the opening act for artists including Grace Potter and the Nocturnals, Maroon 5, Blues Traveler, Collective Soul, Cheap Trick, Vertical Horizon, Lifehouse, Undercover and Fuel.

The name Sirsy came from a childhood nickname of Krahmer, whose younger sister couldn't pronounce "sister."

History
The band was formed in 2000.

Originally the group played cover songs, but eventually began writing original material. 

In 2000, the group released Baggage. In 2002, the group released Away from Here as well as a three-song DVD The Three Little Videos, and a live album, At This Time (Live). In 2004, they released Ruby.

In 2010, Sirsy signed a record deal with Funzalo Records and re-released their then-most recent album Revolution, which was remastered by record producer Paul Q. Kolderie.

On March 5, 2013, Sirsy released Coming Into Frame on Funzalo Records which was produced by grammy-winners Paul Q. Kolderie and Sean Slade.

Awards and recognition
 Metroland "Best Local Band" lists and reader polls (2003-2004, 2006, 2009-2011)

 In 2007, Sirsy placed fourth from over 1,000 entries in the "Last Band Standing", a national competition for a place in the 2007 Lollapalooza festival.

Television appearances and films
Sirsy has written theme music for and appeared in promotional spots for Time Warner Cable and the WB Network.

Sirsy's music is used in Dorian Blues.

In 2007, the band made its first national cable television appearance on the national cable network Your Music channel on the City Sessions series.

In January 2008, Sirsy made their first national television broadcast on Fearless Music. The program was shown in syndication on stations throughout the United States.

Sirsy appeared in the 2009 documentary So Right So Smart along with bands such as The Barenaked Ladies and Guster.

Sirsy's song "Cannonball" was used in the Showtime television show "Shameless" in 2016.

Some Kind Of Winter was a members' feature on the WomanRock.com web site.

Revolution was used in 2007 on the Green Arrow radio podcast network.

Discography

References

External links

American musical duos
American pop music groups
Rock music duos
Rock music groups from New York (state)
Musical groups from Albany, New York
Musical groups established in 2000
2000 establishments in New York (state)
Male–female musical duos